The Böhmische Escompte-Bank (BEB) was a significant Prague-based bank with branches in most major towns of Bohemia and, later, Czechoslovakia. In 1919 it was renamed Böhmische Escompte-Bank und Credit-Anstalt (BEBCA).

History

The  was founded in 1863 with sponsorship from the Vienna-based Niederösterreichische Escompte-Gesellschaft, aiming at promotion of industry with a main clientele of German-speakers and Bohemian Jews. In 1901, it was wholly taken over by the Niederösterreichische Escompte-Gesellschaft. 

In 1919, the latter was expropriated under the Czechosolovak policy of "nostrification", and Prague-based Živnostenská banka became the bank's controlling shareholder. The bank subsequently changed its name to BEBCA. It ranked third or fourth among Czechoslovakia's joint-stock banks during most of the interwar period. 

After the creation of the Protectorate of Bohemia-Moravia, Dresdner Bank took a majority stake in BEBCA, which it renamed . During  World War II the bank, headed by Rudolf Reiner, was one of the institutions participating in the so-called Reinhardt's fund, namely the confiscation of jewels, silver and gold from concentration camp inmates. It also financed construction of some of the concentration camps through commercial credits to the SS and its subsidiary DEST company. The bank ceased activity in 1945 under the Beneš decrees and was gradually liquidated afterwards. 

From 1945 to 1960, the former head office of the bank in Prague was used as headquarters by the Central Secretariat of the Communist Party of Czechoslovakia. After that, it went to the pioneers of the Czechoslovak Youth Association. After the Velvet Revolution, it became the head office of the newly established Komerční banka, since 2001 a subsidiary of France's Société Générale.

See also
 Živnostenská banka
 Anglo-Czechoslovak and Prague Credit Bank

Notes

External links
 

Defunct Banks of Czechoslovakia
Banks established in 1863